Dongxiaonan Station, formerly Dongxiao Nanlu Station while in planning, is a metro station on Line 2 of the Guangzhou Metro. The underground station is located at the junction of Dongxiao Road South and Qiaogang Road in the Haizhu District.

Neighboring Building  
South Noble Garden

ExploreGuangzhou 

Railway stations in China opened in 2010
Guangzhou Metro stations in Haizhu District